Dismorphia amphione, the tiger mimic white, is a species of butterfly of the family Pieridae. It is found from Mexico and the Caribbean down to Brazil and Bolivia.

The wingspan is about 77 mm. It is an extremely variable species.

The larvae feed on Inga species, including I. sapindoides and I. densiflora.

Dismorphia amphione mimics the ithomiine butterflies of the genus Mechanitis (M. lysimnia, M. polymnia, M. mazaeus, M. menapis) in colour pattern and in the slow regular flight.

Subspecies
D. a. amphione (Suriname)
D. a. astynome (Dalman, 1823) (Brazil (São Paulo, Bahia, Minas Gerais), Argentina)
D. a. praxinoe (Doubleday, 1844) (Mexico, from Panama to Colombia)
D. a. beroe (Lucas, 1852) (Colombia)
D. a. egaena (Bates, 1861) (Brazil (Amazonas))
D. a. discrepans Butler, 1896 (Ecuador)
D. a. rhomboidea Butler, 1896 (Ecuador, Peru)
D. a. broomeae Butler, 1899 (Venezuela, Trinidad)
D. a. meridionalis Röber, 1909 (Bolivia)
D. a. daguana Bargmann, 1929 (Colombia, Ecuador)
D. a. lupita Lamas, 1979 (Mexico)
D. a. isolda Llorente, 1984 (Mexico)
D. a. bertha Lamas, 2004 (Peru)
D. a. mora Lamas, 2004 (Peru)

Gallery

References

Dismorphiinae
Pieridae of South America
Butterflies of North America
Butterflies described in 1779
Taxa named by Pieter Cramer